Clontead Beg is a townland within the civil parish of Magourney and Catholic parish of Aghabullogue, County Cork, Ireland. It is approximately 229 acres in size, and east of Coachford village.

In the Down Survey (Muskery Map, 1656-8), it is referred to as 'Clonete Beg', but does not appear as a 'denomination' on the Down Survey parish map, nor is it mentioned in the accompanying terrier.

The Ordnance Survey name book describes the western end of the townland as forming the village of Coachford and the eastern end the 'Derreen Demesne'. Variations of the placename include 'Clontade', 'Clontead', 'Clontadebeg' and 'Clontade Beg'. A suggested Irish version is Cluain Téide Beg, with 'Cluain Téide' interpreted as 'plain or lawn of the green [hill]'. O'Murchú (1991) gives an Irish version of Cluain Téide, suggesting 'Téide' as meaning a plateau, or a plain on a hill; essentially 'plain of the flat-topped hill'. The Placenames Database of Ireland gives the townland an Irish name of Cluain Téide Bheag, with 'Cluain' meaning 'meadow' or 'pasture'.

References

Townlands of County Cork